Viðar Halldórsson (born 23 May 1953) is an Icelandic former footballer who played as a defender for FH and the Iceland national team. After his retirement, he returned to his home club in an administrative role, currently serving as chairman.

Playing career

Club career
Viðar spent his entire career with his hometown club FH, making his first-team debut in 1970 and playing in over 400 matches. He helped them achieve promotion to the Úrvalsdeild karla three different times, including two first-place finishes in the second-tier 1. deild karla in 1974 and 1984.

Apart from football, he played handball at the youth level for FH and a stint at the senior level for Stjarnan.

International career
Viðar earned 27 caps with the Iceland national team, making his senior international debut on 16 June 1976 in a friendly against Faroe Islands, although it is not officially recognized since their opponent was not a FIFA member at the time. Two months later he replaced Ólafur Sigurvinsson during a 3–1 win over Luxembourg that marked his first FIFA-sanctioned international appearance.

He went on to represent his country in the 1978 and 1982 FIFA World Cup qualification campaigns as well as UEFA Euro 1984 qualifying, wearing the captain armband on six occasions. His last appearance came in a 3–0 defeat to Ireland in 1983.

Business and administrative career
During his playing career, Viðar studied business and accounting at the University of Iceland. He entered the shipping and real estate industries, holding executive positions at multiple companies.

He returned to FH in 1990 as vice-chairman of the football department, and in 2008 was elected chairman of the club as a whole. He also presides on the board of the European Club Association.

Personal life
He married Guðrún Bjarney Bjarnadóttir in 1976; all three of their sons (Arnar, Davíð and Bjarni) became professional footballers who went on to represent Iceland internationally.

Career statistics

International

Honours

Club
FH
 1. deild karla: 1974, 1984

See also
 List of one-club men in association football

References

External links
 
 
 

Living people
1953 births
Vidar Halldorsson
Vidar Halldorsson
Association football defenders
Vidar Halldorsson
Vidar Halldorsson
1. deild karla players
Vidar Halldorsson
Vidar Halldorsson
Association football executives
Vidar Halldorsson
Vidar Halldorsson